Events in the year 1988 in the Netherlands.

Incumbents
 Monarch: Beatrix
 Prime Minister: Ruud Lubbers

Events
30 April — Queen's Day. During this day: Queen Beatrix kissed by a bystander.
1 May – 1988 IRA attacks in the Netherlands
25 June - Dutch national soccer team wins UEFA Euro 1988 in West Germany.

Births

6 January – Marly van der Velden, actress and fashion designer 
18 February – Stefan Struve, mixed martial artist
16 March – Johim Ariesen, cyclist
30 March – Ruben Lenten, professional kite surfer
4 May – Nycke Groot, handball player.
17 June – Marit Bouwmeester, competitive sailor.
5 August – Stefanie Joosten, model, singer and actress
9 August – Etienne Bax, sidecarcross rider
18 October – Jorina Baars, kickboxer
18 October – Tessa Schram, actress and director
15 December – Amber Arcades, singer-songwriter
15 December – Boaz van de Beatz, record producer and DJ

Full date missing
Rutger Bregman, historian
Jan-Willem Breure, media producer and festival director

Deaths
4 January – Leo de Block, politician (b. 1904)
29 January – Rogier van Otterloo, composer and conductor (b. 1941)
13 February – Tim Griek, musician and producer (b. 1944)
13 May – Caecilia Loots, teacher and antifascist resistance member (b. 1903)
14 May – Willem Dreesm politician (b. 1886)
1 July – Willem Drees, composer (b. 1919)
10 August – Paul Lodewijkx, motorcycle road racer (b. 1947) 
4 December – Jan Mesdag, singer and cabaret artist (b. 1953)
25 December – Cornelis Eecen, competitive rower (b. 1898).

Full date missing
Josef Santen, painter (b. 1926)

References

 
1980s in the Netherlands
Years of the 20th century in the Netherlands
Netherlands
Netherlands